Rolling Fork is a town in Sharkey County, Mississippi. The population was 1,883 as of the 2020 Census. It is the county seat of Sharkey County.

History

Thomas Y. Chaney located here in 1828, and was the first settler in the county.  Deer Creek flows through the settlement, and Chaney called the place "Rolling Fork" because of the swiftness of the water at a fork in the creek there. A post office was established in 1848. When Sharkey County was established in 1876, Rolling Fork was made the county seat. A newspaper, The Deer Creek Pilot, was established in 1884.

The Louisville, New Orleans and Texas Railway was built through Rolling Fork in 1883. It was later acquired by the Illinois Central Railroad. In 1908, the Bank of Rolling Fork was established.

Geography

Demographics

2020 census

As of the 2020 United States Census, there were 1,883 people, 857 households, and 498 families residing in the city.

2000 census
As of the census of 2000, there were 2,486 people, 820 households, and 620 families residing in the city. The population density was 1,774.2 people per square mile (685.6/km). There were 875 housing units at an average density of 624.5 per square mile (241.3/km). The racial makeup of the city was 69.19% African American, 29.69% White, 0.04% Native American, 0.32% Asian, and 0.76% from two or more races. Hispanic or Latino of any race were 0.97% of the population.

There were 820 households, out of which 35.9% had children under the age of 18 living with them, 37.9% were married couples living together, 32.8% had a female householder with no husband present, and 24.3% were non-families. 22.2% of all households were made up of individuals, and 9.5% had someone living alone who was 65 years of age or older. The average household size was 2.90 and the average family size was 3.40.

In the city, the population was spread out, with 30.8% under the age of 18, 11.9% from 18 to 24, 23.8% from 25 to 44, 20.4% from 45 to 64, and 13.2% who were 65 years of age or older. The median age was 32 years. For every 100 females, there were 83.6 males. For every 100 females age 18 and over, there were 75.4 males.

The median income for a household in the city was $23,081, and the median income for a family was $24,911. Males had a median income of $25,729 versus $17,065 for females. The per capita income for the city was $11,481. About 30.6% of families and 37.1% of the population were below the poverty line, including 50.0% of those under age 18 and 24.6% of those age 65 or over.

Education

Public schools
The city of Rolling Fork is served by the South Delta School District. The district has three schools with a total enrollment of approximately 1,300 students.

Private schools
 Sharkey-Issaquena Academy

Notable people

 Robert Colby, songwriter and theater producer
 Tommy Davidson, actor and professional comedian
 Johnny Dyer, blues musician
 Jack Holmes, professional football player
 Larry Smith, professional basketball player
 Willie Mae Ford Smith, gospel singer
 Slick Watts, professional basketball player
 Fielding L. Wright, Governor of Mississippi and 1948 vice-presidential candidate
 Geraldine Pervical Atchley, First female pharmacist in the state of Mississippi

References

External links

Cities in Mississippi
Cities in Sharkey County, Mississippi
County seats in Mississippi